Radio 5RPH (1197 kHz) is a volunteer manned AM band community radio station in Adelaide, South Australia Australia for the blind.

Radio 5RPH is a member of the Radio Print Handicapped Network. Its stated mission is to "provide a quality reading and information service to those within its broadcast area who are unable (for whatever reason) to access daily printed material".

Newspapers, magazines, books, and other printed material are read to air.  The station also hosts a morning sports show weekday mornings and broadcasts matches from the South Australian National Football League.

See also
 List of radio stations in Australia
 Radio Print Handicapped Network

References

External links
 
 RPH South Australia
 IRIS Adelaide (DAB +)

Radio stations in Adelaide
Radio reading services of Australia